An outdoor sculpture of Jack Brickhouse is installed along Michigan Avenue, near the Chicago River bridge, in Chicago, Illinois. The bust was originally dedicated in 2000, and renovated in 2009.

See also
 2000 in art
 List of public art in Chicago

References

2000 establishments in Illinois
2000 sculptures
Busts in Illinois
Monuments and memorials in Chicago
Outdoor sculptures in Chicago
Sculptures of men in Illinois